Gnathophis tritos is an eel in the family Congridae (conger/garden eels). It was described by David G. Smith and Robert H. Kanazawa in 1977. It is a marine, deep water-dwelling eel which is known from the Straits of Florida, in the western central Atlantic Ocean. It dwells at a depth range of 458–567 meters.

Gnathophis tritos was given its species epithet due to its being the third species in its genus discovered in the western Atlantic.

References

tritos
Taxa named by David G. Smith
Taxa named by Robert H. Kanazawa
Fish described in 1977